CDMA frequency bands or frequency ranges are the cellular frequencies designated by the ITU for the operation of cdmaOne and CDMA2000 mobile phones and other mobile devices.

Frequency bands 
From the latest published version of the respective 3GPP2 technical standard (C.S0057-F), the following table lists the specified frequency bands of the cdmaOne and CDMA2000 standards.

See also 
 List of CDMA2000 networks
 3GPP2
 Cellular frequencies
 OD-GPS
 Roaming
 GSM frequency bands
 UMTS frequency bands
 LTE frequency bands
 5G NR frequency bands

References 

Bandplans
3rd Generation Partnership Project 2 standards